Bodicote is a village and civil parish about  south of the centre of Banbury in Oxfordshire. The 2011 Census recorded the parish's population as 2,126.

History
Bodicote was made a separate civil and Church of England parish in 1855. Until then it was part of the parish of Adderbury.  The Domesday Book of 1086 records a windmill that stood next to the grove at the top of Bodicote. Sor Brook, which forms the boundary between Adderbury and Bodicote parishes, has a watermill. Bodicote House is a large Georgian house with a number of Victorian additions. It is now the main office for Cherwell District Council.

Churches

Church of England
The Church of England parish church of Saint John the Baptist was a chapel of ease of St Mary the Virgin, Adderbury until 1855. Its chancel arch is 13th-century. The building has north and south aisles linked to the nave by 14th century arcades of three bays each. There used to be a bell tower over the north aisle. In 1844 the architects John Plowman and H.J. Underwood effected an almost complete rebuilding of St John's that included demolishing the old tower and replacing it with the current west tower. The church is a Grade II* listed building.

The tower has a ring of eight bells, all from the Whitechapel Bell Foundry. Thomas II Mears cast a ring of five bells (the present fourth, fifth, sixth, seventh and tenor bells) in 1843. The present treble, second and third bells were cast and hung in 1974, increasing the ring to eight. The tower has an iron-framed turret clock that was made by John Wise of London in 1700. The clock was renewed and modified in 1843, probably by Thomas Strange of Banbury.

Methodist
Bodicote Methodist church was built in 1845.

Amenities

Bodicote has a Church of England primary school. The village has two pubs: the Horse and Jockey and the Plough. It has also the Spice Room Indian restaurant, which used to be the Baker's Arms pub. It was built in 1702 and latterly was controlled by Mitchells & Butlers brewery. There is a SPAR store and sub-Post Office in Molyneux Drive. Bodicote has also a hairdressing salon.  

Bodicote Cricket Club plays in the South Northants Cricket League.  Every year since 2000 a group of local volunteers has organised the Bodfest village festival on King's Field. The festival typically takes place in late July and early August and includes live bands, a pig roast and a barn dance. A plastic duck race and raffle are held each spring on the Sor Brook to raise funds for the festival.

Expansion
In the early 2000s the District Council's planning department put forward in its Local Plan plans to build the new Longford Park housing estate, east of Bodicote village and south of the Cherwell Heights housing estate of Banbury. In February 2006 Cherwell District Council approved the plans to meet a housing target despite a 20,000 signature petition against it. About 1,070 houses are being built along with local shops, a public house, church, restaurant, primary school and other local services. Currently in November 2022 there is only a Primary School and a Community Centre in the building originally earmarked for a doctors’ surgery.

Public transport
Stagecoach in Oxfordshire bus route B3 runs half-hourly, Mondays to Saturdays, between Bodicote village and Hardwick Hill via Banbury town centre. There is no evening, Sunday or bank holiday service. Stagecoach in Oxfordshire route S4 serves the A4260 main road along the eastern edge of Bodicote village. It runs hourly, Mondays to Fridays, between Banbury and Oxford.

Notable people
Arthur Cobb (1864–1886), cricketer
Diana Darvey  Actress (Benny Hill, Carry On)

See also
History of Banbury, Oxfordshire

References

Sources

External links

Bodicote Parish Council
Bodicote Church

Civil parishes in Oxfordshire
Villages in Oxfordshire